María ("Masa") Ángeles Rodríguez Suárez (born 12 April 1957 in Gijón, Asturias) is a former field hockey player from Spain, who was a member of the Women's National Team that won the gold medal at the 1992 Summer Olympics on home soil (Barcelona).

References

External links
 
 

1957 births
Living people
Spanish female field hockey players
Olympic field hockey players of Spain
Field hockey players at the 1992 Summer Olympics
Olympic gold medalists for Spain
Sportspeople from Gijón
Olympic medalists in field hockey
Medalists at the 1992 Summer Olympics
20th-century Spanish women